Barco is an unincorporated community in Currituck County, North Carolina, United States at the southern terminus of North Carolina Highway 168, on U.S. Highway 158.

It is the home of Currituck County High School and Currituck County Middle School.

References

Unincorporated communities in Currituck County, North Carolina
Unincorporated communities in North Carolina
Populated coastal places in North Carolina